Fernando Barrachina Plo (24 February 1947 – 4 January 2016) was a Spanish professional footballer who played as a central defender.

Career
Born in Granada, Barrachina played for Granada, Valencia and Cádiz.

He made one international appearance for Spain in 1969.

Later life and death
He died on 4 January 2016, at the age of 68.

References

External links
 
 National team data at BDFutbol
 CiberChe stats and bio 
 Stats and bio at Cadistas1910 
 

1947 births
2016 deaths
Spanish footballers
Footballers from Granada
Association football central defenders
La Liga players
Segunda División players
Granada CF footballers
Valencia CF players
Cádiz CF players
Spain under-23 international footballers
Spain international footballers